Andy Rosen, stage name Goat, is an American singer, best known for his song "Great Life", which appeared on the soundtrack of the film, I Know What You Did Last Summer.

The same song is perhaps more recognizable from its repeated airings in a Kia Sportage broadcast beginning in 2005, and played as people of various stripes toss the car keys to one another.

Born in Cleveland, Rosen's father Al Rosen was a star third baseman for the Cleveland Indians.

Goat recorded a cover version of Fall Out Boy's "Sugar, We're Goin' Down", for Engine Room Recordings' compilation album, Guilt by Association, released on September 4, 2007.

Discography
 Great Life (1998)
 All of My Friends (2005)
 Twisted Heart (2006)

References

External links
Interview with the Houston Press

Year of birth missing (living people)
Living people
American male singers
Musicians from Cleveland